...La bocca mi bacio tutto tremante is an Italian black-and-white silent film. It was released in September 1919 by director Ubaldo Maria Del Colle. The name comes from Inferno (Dante).

Cast
Ubaldo Maria Del Colle
Tina Kassay
Luciano Molinari
Tina Somma

References

External links

1919 films
Italian black-and-white films
Italian silent feature films
Films directed by Ubaldo Maria Del Colle